Events in the year 1896 in Norway.

Incumbents
Monarch: Oscar II
Prime Minister: Francis Hagerup

Events

 11 July – Noregs Ungdomslag (lit. "Norway's youth society") was founded.

Popular culture

Sports
3 March – FC Lyn Oslo football club is founded.

Music

Theathre

Literature

Births

January to March
4 January
Jørgen Løvset, gynecologist and academic (died 1981)
Johanne Reutz Gjermoe, economist and politician (died 1989).
2 February – Einar Ræder, long jumper (died 1976)
5 February – Paul Tjøstolsen Sunde, politician (died 1958)
9 February – Arthur Rydstrøm, gymnast and Olympic silver medallist (died 1986)
10 February – Alf Aanning, gymnast and Olympic silver medallist (died 1948)
17 February – Arthur Qvist, horse rider and Olympic silver medallist (died 1973)
22 February – Ingvald Johannes Jaklin, politician (died 1966)

April to June
9 April – Cato Andreas Sverdrup, politician (died 1948)
20 April – Asbjørn Bodahl, gymnast and Olympic silver medallist (died 1962)
21 April – Leif Høegh, shipowner (died 1974)
22 April – Gunnar Jamvold, sailor and Olympic gold medallist (died 1984)
22 May – Leiv Kreyberg, pathologist (died 1984).

July to September
16 July – Trygve Lie, politician, the first elected United Nations Secretary-General (died 1968)
19 July – Olaf Solumsmoen, newspaper editor and politician (died 1972)
27 July – Ivar Andresen, opera singer (died 1940)
27 July – Olav Svalastog, politician (died 1979)
21 August – Gunnar Reiss-Andersen, poet and author (died 1964)
25 August – Eilif Løvrak Holmesland, jurist and politician
11 September – Isak Larsson Flatabø, politician (died 1969)
20 September – Einar Gundersen, international soccer player (died 1962)
22 September – Claudia Olsen, politician (died 1980)

October to December
8 October – Jon Vislie, lawyer, executed as a reprisal (died 1945)
25 October – Karl Marthinsen, commander of Statspolitiet and Sikkerhetspolitiet in Norway during the Nazi occupation (died 1945)
26 October – Johs Haugerud, politician (died 1971)
1 November – Mathias Torstensen, rower
12 November – Lars Evensen, trade unionist and politician (died 1969)

Full date unknown
Gunnar Bråthen, politician and Minister (died 1980)
Mons Lid, politician and Minister (died 1967)
Asbjørn Øverås, educator (died 1966)
Alfred Trønsdal, politician (died 1953)

Deaths
3 January – Andreas Grimelund, bishop (born 1812)
16 February – Jens Andreas Friis, linguist and author (born 1821)
23 September – Ivar Aasen, philologist, lexicographer, playwright and poet (born 1813)

Full date unknown
Ludvig Aubert, politician and Minister (born 1838)
Ludvig Maribo Benjamin Aubert, jurist and politician (born 1836)
Peter Hersleb Graah Birkeland, bishop (born 1807)
Jess Julius Engelstad, engineer and railroad administrator (born 1822)
Baard Madsen Haugland, politician (born 1835)
Erik Jørgensen, master gunsmith (born 1848)
Lars Anton Nicolai Larsen-Naur, politician (born 1841)
Olav Paulssøn, bailiff, writer and politician (born 1822)

See also

References